Eucalyptus × phylacis, commonly known as the Meelup mallee, is a species of tree or a robust mallee that is endemic to a small area in the southwest of Western Australia. It has rough, hard and corky bark on the trunk and larger branches, lance-shaped or curved adult leaves, flower buds in groups of eleven, creamy white flowers and hemispherical fruit. It is possibly a hybrid between E. decipiens and E. virginea.

Description
Flowering occurs in May and the flowers are creamy white.

Taxonomy
Eucalyptus phylacis was first formally described in 1992 by Lawrie Johnson and Ken Hill in the journal Telopea from a specimen collected on the east side of Cape Naturaliste in 1983. In 2012, Dean Nicolle suggested that this species is a hybrid between E. decipiens and E. virginea and that although it flowers profusely, it does not produce viable seed. The Australian Plant Census lists Eucalyptus × phylacis as an accepted species but a hybrid.

Distribution and habitat
Meelup mallee is only known from a single population near Eagle Bay in the Meelup Regional Park where it grows in mallee heath.

Conservation status
This eucalypt is classified as "Threatened Flora (Declared Rare Flora — Extant)" by the Department of Environment and Conservation (Western Australia).

See also
List of Eucalyptus species

References

Eucalypts of Western Australia
Trees of Australia
phylacis
Myrtales of Australia
Plants described in 1992
Plant nothospecies